The 1910 Wellington City mayoral election was held to determine the next Mayor of Wellington. The polling was conducted using the standard first-past-the-post electoral method.

Background
The incumbent Mayor, Alfred Newman did not stand for re-election. At this time Wellington held their council elections biennially and the Mayoralty was annually. Thomas Wilford was elected to office as the new Mayor of Wellington, after four unsuccessful attempts prior, beating his sole opponent Charles John Crawford.

The 1910 local elections were the first in which residents as well as ratepayers were eligible to vote.

Mayoralty results

The following table gives the election results:

Notes

References

Mayoral elections in Wellington
1910 elections in New Zealand
Politics of the Wellington Region
1910s in Wellington